Paria quadrinotata is a species of leaf beetle. It is found in North America.

References

Further reading

 

Eumolpinae
Articles created by Qbugbot
Beetles described in 1824
Taxa named by Thomas Say
Beetles of North America